The Khechari Vidya (Sanskrit: खेचरीविद्या, knowledge of Khechari), an early tantric text on Hatha yoga written around the 14th century, teaches only  khecarīmudrā, one of several yogic seals or mudras, and is a major source for that method. This was meant to give the yogin access to stores of amrita in the body, and to raise Kundalinī via the six chakras.

Text 

The Khecarīvidyā is written as a dialogue between the god Śiva and his partner, Devī. The text was originally a single chapter about the deity Khecarī's mantra (the "vidyā") in the Kaula tradition of tantric Shaivism. It was then reorganised into three sections and extended with an account of khecarīmudrā, complete with praise of the use of alcohol, madirā. A fourth section, on magical herbs, was then added, by which time most of the Kaula aspects had been edited out to suit a hatha yoga readership.

Khecarī mudrā 

Khecarī Mudrā (Sanskrit, खेचरी मुद्रा) is a hatha yoga practice carried out by curling the tip of the tongue back into the mouth until it reaches above the soft palate and into the nasal cavity. In the full practice, the tongue is made long enough to do this with many months of daily tongue stretching, and by gradually severing the lingual frenulum with a sharp implement, again little by little over a period of months.

References

Sources 

 
 
 
 
 
 

Hindu texts
Works of unknown authorship
Hatha yoga texts
Sanskrit texts